Naam (English: Us) is a 2018 Indian Malayalam-language drama film written, directed and produced by debutant Joshy Thomas Pallickal. It features and tells the story of a group of youngsters.

Cast

Production
Principal photography commenced in February 2017 at Mundakayam. The other locations were Kuttikkanam and Ponkunnam and Saintgits College of Engineering.

Music
The music and background score for the film is composed by Ashwin and Sandeep. The audio launch was held in Kochi on 11 November.
All lyrics are written by Shabareesh Varma except where noted; all music is composed by Ashwin Sivadas, Sandeep Mohan.

Release
The film was released on 11 May 2018.

The Times of India rated the film 3 out of 5 stars, commenting "Naam is not devoid of flaws but it has sincerity written all over it, and might even leave some of you choked, through its touching plot. Give it a shot if movies with a heavy dose of friendship can entertain you".

References

External links
 

2010s Malayalam-language films
Indian drama films
2018 drama films